Shiremanstown is a borough in Cumberland County, Pennsylvania, United States. Bordered to the north by Hampden Township and to the south by Lower Allen Township, it is part of the Harrisburg–Carlisle Metropolitan Statistical Area.

The population was one thousand five hundred and sixty-nine at the time of the 2010 census.

History
Sometime before 1797, a German Reformed church and school were established near the community of Shiremanstown in Cumberland County, Pennsylvania. It became known as the "Peace Church." Nearly one hundred years later, the log structure was still in use, but only as a school by that time. As the surrounding communities grew over the years, the church's congregation also continued to grow. Eventually, the congregation became known as St. John's Evangelical Lutheran Church. in 1897, leaders of the congregation expanded the church further by purchasing the old Messiah church located in Shiremanstown. Initially used for evening services, that building also became the congregation's home during the winter months, and was in use regularly until it was destroyed by fire on September 2, 1908.

Geography
Shiremanstown is bordered to the north by Hampden Township and to the south by Lower Allen Township.

Demographics

As of the 2000 census, there were one thousand five hundred and twenty-one people, seven hundred and nineteen households and four hundred and seven families residing in the borough. The population density was 5,105.8 people per square mile (1,957.5/km2).

There were seven hundred and forty-two housing units at an average density of 2,490.8 per square mile (955.0/km2).

The racial makeup of the borough was 95.33% White, 0.53% African American, 0.07% Native American, 2.43% Asian, 0.33% from other races, and 1.31% from two or more races. Hispanic or Latino of any race were 0.53% of the population.

There were seven hundred and nineteen households, out of which 22.5% had children under the age of eighteen living with them; 46.2% were married couples living together, 8.8% had a female householder with no husband present, and 43.3% were non-families. 38.0% of all households were made up of individuals, and 11.7% had someone living alone who was sixty-five years of age or older. The average household size was 2.12 and the average family size was 2.83.

In the borough the population was spread out, with 20.2% under the age of eighteen, 7.0% from eighteen to twenty-four, 29.9% from twenty-five to forty-four, 23.6% from forty-five to sixty-four, and 19.3% who were sixty-five years of age or older. The median age was forty years. For every one hundred females, there were 84.6 males. 

For every one hundred females aged eighteen and over, there were 84.5 males.

The median household income in the borough was $43,971, and the median income for a family was $55,268. Males had a median income of $37,500 compared with that of $30,326 for females. The per capita income for the borough was $21,812. 

Roughly 1.8% of families and 5.0% of the population were below the poverty line, including 3.5% of those under age eighteen and 2.8% of those aged sixty-five or over.

References

External links
 

Populated places established in 1813
Harrisburg–Carlisle metropolitan statistical area
Boroughs in Cumberland County, Pennsylvania